Microsoft Research Labs are laboratories operated by Microsoft Research for researching computer science topics and issues. 

Microsoft Research Labs  may also refer to:
 Microsoft Live Labs, a partnership between MSN and Microsoft Research between 2006 and 2010
 Microsoft adCenter Labs, an applied research group at Microsoft that supports Microsoft adCenter
 Microsoft FUSE Labs, an applied research group that focuses on real-time and media rich experiences